Grinstead is an English surname, and a place name. It may refer to:

People
Baron Grinstead, a title in the peerage of Ireland (see Earl of Enniskillen)
Burt Grinstead (born 1988), U.S. actor
Charles Walder Grinstead (1860–1930), English tennis player
Elizabeth Key Grinstead (1630–c. after 1665), African-American slave
Eric Grinstead (1921–2008), New Zealander sinologist and linguist
Grinstead (Kent cricketer) (c. 1788), British cricketer
James F. Grinstead (1845–1921), U.S. politician
Jesse Edward Grinstead (1866–1948), U.S. publisher, editor, poet, and politician
Minnie J. Grinstead (1869–1925), U.S. teacher, politician, and temperance activist
Orish Grinstead (1980–2008), U.S. musical artist (see 702)
Ronald Grinstead (born 1942), retired British international wrestler
Tara Grinstead (born 1974), U.S. high school history teacher (see Tara Grinstead murder case)
Jared Grinstead (born 1976), U.S. middle school science teacher and Purdue University Graduate (2000)

Places
East Grinstead, English town and civil parish in the northeastern corner of Mid Sussex, West Sussex
West Grinstead, English village and civil parish in the Horsham District of West Sussex

See also
 Grensted (disambiguation)

Grinstead company is a large gold mining company in Victoria  Australia